Walter David Bingle  (12 April 18617 August 1928) was a senior Australian public servant, best known for his time as head of the Department of Works and Railways.

Life and career
Bingle was born in Newcastle, New South Wales on 12 April 1861. For schooling he attended Newcastle Grammar School, before starting work in his father's shipping agency.

At Federation, Bingle joined the Commonwealth Public Service as a chief clerk in the Department of Home Affairs. Between 1917 and 1926, Bingle was Secretary of the Department of Works and Railways.

Death
Bingle died on 7 August 1928 in Brighton, Melbourne, and was buried in Brighton cemetery.

Awards
Bingle was made a Companion of the Imperial Service Order for his services as Secretary of the Commonwealth Works Department in June 1923.

References

1861 births
1928 deaths
Australian public servants
Australian Companions of the Imperial Service Order
People from Newcastle, New South Wales